Larry Satcowitz is a Vermont educator and politician elected to the Vermont's House of Representatives representing the Orange-Washington-Addison district.

Satcowitz ran for the position in the 2018 election but lost to Independent Ben Jickling. Jickling left the position partway through his term and was replaced by Independent Peter Reed by Governor Phil Scott. Satcowitz defeated Reed in 2020, and is serving alongside incumbent representative Jay Hooper.

Satcowitz's platform focused on education, the economy and health care as well as the need to do something about the urgent issues of climate change and systemic racism. He was endorsed in 2018 and 2020 by Bernie Sanders.

Satcowitz is a three-term member of the Randolph Selectboard.

References

External links
 Election website

21st-century American politicians
Living people
Democratic Party members of the Vermont House of Representatives
Year of birth missing (living people)